Dead River Cattle Mound is a historic earthen mound located in Congaree National Park near Hopkins, Richland County, South Carolina. It was built by settlers in the Congaree Swamp to provide a place of refuge for hogs, cattle, and other grazing animals during the flood season. Dead River Cattle Mound is an oval mound measuring approximately 250 feet in diameter, with a 3 to 5 foot tall flat top.

It was added to the National Register of Historic Places in 1996.

References

Cattle mounds
Agricultural buildings and structures on the National Register of Historic Places in South Carolina
Buildings and structures in Richland County, South Carolina
National Register of Historic Places in Congaree National Park